The 1984 Costa Del Sol Classic was a professional invitational snooker tournament which took place in August 1984. The tournament was held at the Las Palmeras Hotel in Fuengirola, Spain, and featured 12 professional players.

The four qualifying matches were played under a best-of-five frames format, as were the quarter-finals and semi-finals, and the final best of nine. Dennis Taylor won the event, by defeating Mike Hallett 5–2 in the final.

Qualifying
Four players participated in qualifying for the quarter-finals, to which Tony Knowles, Taylor, Joe Johnson and Mark Wildman were already seeded.

Round 1

 3–2 
 3–0 
 3–2 
 3–1

Main draw

Quarter-finals

 3–0 
 3–2 
 3–1 
 3–1

Semi-finals

 3–0 
 3–2

Final

 5–2

Century breaks

105 

100

References

Snooker non-ranking competitions
Snooker competitions in England
1984 in snooker
1984 in English sport